KDUL-LP (channel 12) was a low-power television station in Duluth, Minnesota, United States, which operated from October 2000 to August 2001. The station was owned by Duluth Broadcasting Partners and managed by ESI Broadcasting. KDUL-LP's office and master control were located in Fitger's Brewery Complex, a popular shopping and entertainment venue. Its transmitter was located on Duluth's Observation Hill.

History
KDUL-LP was originally K60EZ (channel 60), which carried a scrambled version of Nickelodeon as part of an eight-channel subscription TV service which operated between 1993 and 1998.

After several missed launch dates, KDUL-LP began regular broadcasting on October 1, 2000, carrying UPN, the American Independent Network, and Entertainment Tonight. It was also carried in Duluth and Superior on channel 16 via Charter Communications. The system also carried then-UPN affiliate KMSP-TV from Minneapolis–Saint Paul as a regional superstation and blacked out UPN programming on KMSP at KDUL-LP's request.

KDUL-LP was to have been co-managed with KWMN-LP (channel 56) in Duluth, another former subscription TV station which was to have carried Pax TV. KWMN never signed on. There were also plans to rebroadcast KDUL-LP on W25CA (channel 25, later WAST-LP) in Ashland, Wisconsin, which also never materialized.

ESI Broadcasting severed its management relationship with the station in April 2001. Shortly thereafter, the owners put the station up for sale and laid off all employees except one technician. The station left the air permanently on August 31, 2001, after news that Charter planned to drop KDUL-LP due to poor video and audio quality; the provider had also taken heavy criticism due to the compulsory blackouts of KMSP during UPN hours despite KDUL-LP barely having a viewable signal. No buyer was ever found.

During its entire run on Channel 12, KDUL-LP operated under construction permit program test authority. The construction permit for Channel 12 was canceled after KDUL-LP went silent. The Federal Communications Commission (FCC) deleted KDUL-LP on May 15, 2008, nearly seven years after its last broadcast.

References

External links
NorthPine.com screengrab of KDUL-LP from 2000

Defunct television stations in the United States
Television stations in Duluth, Minnesota
Television channels and stations established in 2000
2000 establishments in Minnesota
Television channels and stations disestablished in 2001
2001 disestablishments in Minnesota
Defunct mass media in Minnesota